C26 is a secondary route in Namibia that runs from south-central Windhoek, at the B1 road junction, to the C14 road near Rostock.

When the C26 and B1 intersect in Windhoek, they are both referred to as Mandume Ndemufayo Avenue.

References 

Roads in Namibia
Windhoek